The International Crops Research Institute for the Semi-Arid Tropics (ICRISAT) is a pioneering, international non-profit scientific research for development organization, specializing in improving dryland farming and agri-food systems.  The Institute was established as an international organization in 1972, by a Memorandum of Agreement between the Consultative Group on International Agricultural Research and the Government of India.  ICRISAT works with global partners to develop innovative science-backed solutions to overcoming hunger, malnutrition, poverty, and environmental degradation on behalf of the 2.1 billion people who reside in the drylands of Asia, Sub-Saharan Africa, and beyond. 

The institute is headquartered in Patancheru (Hyderabad, Telangana, India) with several regional centers (Bamako (Mali), Nairobi (Kenya) and research stations (Niamey (Niger), Kano (Nigeria), Lilongwe (Malawi), Addis Ababa (Ethiopia), Bulawayo (Zimbabwe).
 
Since its inception, host country India has granted a special status to ICRISAT as a UN Organization operating in the Indian territory making it eligible for special immunities and tax privileges.

ICRISAT is managed by a full-time Director General functioning under the overall guidance of an international Governing Board. The current Director General is Dr Jacqueline d’Arros Hughes who took the post in April 2020. The current chair of the Board is Prof. Prabhu Pingali.

The semi-arid tropics

The semi-arid tropics (SAT) region is characterized by highly variable, low-to-medium rainfall and poor soils, further characterized by lack of irrigation. In general, the historical average annual rainfall in the SAT is below 700 mm. In agricultural policy terms, this region is considered to be a less favored area (LFA).

Research strategy
With almost 50 years of experience addressing the agricultural constraints in the drylands of Africa and Asia, ICRISAT has developed key strengths which are focused on delivering impact in the drylands in alignment with its mission and mandate. ICRISAT has a unique role in dryland agriculture research for development, working through diverse partnerships across Asia and Africa. ICRISAT’s unique comparative strength has been to conduct upstream science and to translate upstream science to applied research. This makes a difference in farmers’ lives by scaling scientific innovations with due attention to the environment, policy, marketing and socioeconomics. In the complex farming systems of the drylands where ICRISAT mandate crops including grain legumes and dryland cereals are grown, integrated solutions are needed to address the challenges of poverty, climate change, nutrition and sustainability of natural resources. 

ICRISAT founded the Smart Food Initiative in 2013 with the Vision to create a world where food is ‘Smart’ – good for you, the planet and the farmer. A key objective is to diversify staples across Africa and Asia, with the initial focus on millets and sorghum.

Mandate crops
ICRISAT performs crop improvement research, using conventional as well as methods derived from biotechnology, on the following crops: chickpea, pigeonpea, groundnut, pearl millet, sorghum, finger millet, teff, and small millets.

ICRISAT's scientific information by topic, crop, location and resources on Exploreit

Research themes and genebank
ICRISAT conducts its research under three Global Research Programs (GRPs): Accelerated Crop Improvement, Resilient Farm and Food Systems, Enabling Systems Transformations. These three GRPs are implemented through 18 research clusters.

The ICRISAT genebank serves as a repository for the collection of germplasm of the six mandate crops – sorghum, pearl millet, finger millet, chickpea, pigeonpea and groundnut; and five small millets – foxtail millet, little millet, kodo millet, proso millet and barnyard millet. The collection has over 128,446 germplasm accessions assembled from 144 countries. Several landraces now conserved in the ICRISAT genebank have disappeared from their natural habitats in Africa and Asia.

Accelerated crop improvement research
Most of ICRISAT’s crop improvement research is directed to deliver climate-resilient improved crop varieties with pest and disease resistance, improved nutritional quality and market preferred traits and improved genetic gains. 

Based on an econometric analysis of time-series data for three different types of agricultural areas (irrigated, high-potential rainfed, and low-potential rainfed), non-ICRISAT experts found more favorable marginal returns (measured as Indian rupees of agricultural production per additional hectare planted to modern varieties) for crop improvement research in low-potential rainfed areas than in either high-potential rainfed areas or irrigated areas. Moreover, additional crop research investment in low potential rainfed areas lifts more people out of poverty than in the other two types of areas.

It was ICRISAT-improved chickpea varieties have been widely adopted in a poor tribal area in Gujarat, India, with favorable impacts on yields, unit production costs, and net returns per hectare. ICRISAT’s package of improved groundnut varieties grown in combination with improved agronomy practices has had a positive result in the semi-arid tropical areas of Central India.

Two major science-based breakthroughs attributed to crop improvement research at ICRISAT relate to pearl millet and pigeonpea. A team of researchers at ICRISAT have released the first public sector-bred, marker-assisted bred hybrid pearl millet, HHB 67. This was released in India in 2006. It is assessed to have superior agronomic performance and improved tolerance to terminal drought. The first-ever release of a hybrid pigeonpea by ICRISAT researchers has been reported in 2008.

Information products and services
ICRISAT formally adopted an open-access policy for its research publications in 2009. It is among a small number of agricultural research organisations to do so. As of June 2010, about 3000 publications are available on the organisation's website.

ICRISAT scientists

See also

Arid Forest Research Institute
CGIAR
Genome Valley

References

International research institutes
Agricultural research institutes in India
Research institutes in Hyderabad, India
1972 establishments in Andhra Pradesh
Research institutes established in 1972